The A49 autoroute is a motorway in France. The road provides a connection between Romans (Valence) with Grenoble.

History
The first section was opened in 1991 between the junction with the A48 towards Voreppe and the junction at Tullins (N°11). Its extension to Romans-sur-Isère was opened in 1992.

Junctions

References

External links

A49 autoroute in Saratlas

A49